Ludger Westrick (23 October 1894 – 31 July 1990) was a German politician (Christian Democratic Union) who served as Head of the German Chancellery from 1963 to 1966 and as Minister for Special Affairs from 1969 to 1972.

He previously was a Wehrwirtschaftsführer in Nazi Germany.

References

1894 births
1990 deaths
Christian Democratic Union of Germany politicians
20th-century German politicians
Government ministers of Germany
Heads of the German Chancellery
People from Münster